Afore Rural LLG is a local-level government (LLG) of Oro Province, Papua New Guinea. The Namiae language and Barai language, both Koiarian languages, are spoken in the LLG.

Wards
01. Yoivi
02. Niniuri
03. Kawowoki
04. Kaura
05. Siurani
06. Kowena
07. Dea
08. Siribu
09. Natanga
10. Gora
11. Tahama
12. Umbuara
13. Kokoro
14. Ufia (Barai language speakers)
15. Toma
16. Aiari
17. Yaure
25. Gorabuna

References

Local-level governments of Oro Province